Boris Uladzimiravich Kit (April 6, 1910 – February 1, 2018) was a Belarusian-American rocket scientist.

Biography
Kit was born on April 6, 1910 in Saint Petersburg, Russian Empire to the family of an employee at the Post and Telegraph Department of Belarusian origin. His true surname is Kita. In 1918 Kit's family moved to their native village of Aharodniki, now the town of Karelichy, Hrodna Voblast. In 1921 this area became a part of the Second Polish Republic.

After graduation from the Navahrudak Belarusian Lyceum in 1928, Kit entered the physics and mathematics faculty of Vilnius University. After graduation in 1933 he worked as a teacher at the Belarusian Gymnasium of Vilnia in Vilnius. In 1939 he was appointed its Principal. After World War II had begun and the Vilnius Region had been handed over to Lithuania, Kit returned to his native region which had been joined to the Byelorussian SSR. He was the Principal of Navahrudak Belarusian High School there and later a superintendent of a large school system district. Hundreds of elementary schools and several dozen high schools were opened in the region within a year due to Kit's direct participation.

Kit worked as a teacher in the village of Lebedzeva near Maladzyechna and later as a director of the Pastavy Teachers College during the Nazi occupation of Belarus. He was suspected of having partisan connections and was arrested by the German SD punitive bodies. He spent a month in prison and was saved from execution by his former pupils.

In 1944, Kit and his family, with the retreating German army moved to Germany, first to Opfenbach near Lindau in Bavaria, then to Munich. In 1948 Kit emigrated to the United States. In 1950 he settled in Los Angeles and worked there as a chemist in various companies.

In the mid-1950s Kit began his scientific activities in the field of astronautics. He worked for 25 years in the American space research program. As a mathematician and systems analyst, he took part in projects aimed at the development of intercontinental missile systems. Kit took part in multiple American space research projects, including the development of the mathematical apparatus behind the mission to the Moon. In 1972 Kit moved to Frankfurt-am-Main in Germany and decided to pursue a career in Europe. He began teaching mathematics at the European College of the University of Maryland at Heidelberg in 1973, where he started a thesis on the work of mathematician and professor at Vilnius University Antoni Zygmund.

Despite his emigration, Kit stayed a conscious Belarusian through all his life: "Everything I did in my life —- I did for my homeland and its fame". He lived out his final years in a Jewish nursing home and celebrated his 107th birthday in 2017. He died on February 1, 2018.

Scientific achievements
Kit is the author of the first manual on rocket propellant "Rocket Propellant Handbook", published by McMillan in 1960. The book received many positive reviews and is referenced in rocket science publications even today. In 1982 Kit earned a Ph.D. in mathematics and science history from the University of Regensburg.

Kit was a long-standing member of the American Institute of Aeronautics and Astronautics, an honorary member of the Hermann Oberth German Astronautics Society Board of Directors, a member of the International Astronautics Academy in Paris, Vice-President of the Eurasian International Astronautics Academy, Professor Emeritus of Maryland University, Honorary Doctorate of Science of Hrodna State University, and Navahrudak's honorable resident.

Publications 
 Boris Kit, Douglas S. Evered. Rocket Propellant Handbook. The Macmillan Company, 1960.

References

External links 
 Barys Kit 100 years anniversary an interview with Barys Kit (in Belarusian)
 A lesson from Barys Kit another interview by young Belarusians (in Belarusian)

1910 births
2018 deaths
Scientists from Saint Petersburg
People from Sankt-Peterburgsky Uyezd
People from South River, New Jersey
Soviet expatriates in Germany
Soviet emigrants to the United States
American people of Belarusian descent
Belarusian physicists
Belarusian centenarians
Men centenarians
American centenarians
Vilnius University alumni